The 2018–19 Armenian Premier League season was the 27th since its establishment. The season began on 4 August 2018 and ended on 30 May 2019.

Teams
The FFA decided to increase the 2018–19 Armenian Premier League participants from six to nine teams, thus three teams from 2017–18 Armenian First League were promoted. These are Ararat-Armenia, Artsakh FC and Lori.

 1Gandzasar Kapan will play their home games at the Yerevan Football Academy Stadium in Yerevan, due to the rebuilding of their regular venue Gandzasar Stadium, Kapan.
 2Lori will play at the main training pitch of the Vanadzor Football Academy due to the rebuilding of their regular venue Vanadzor City Stadium, Vanadzor.

Personnel and sponsorship

League table

Positions by round

Results

First part of season

Second part of season

Season statistics

Top scorers

See also
 Armenian Premier League
 Armenian First League

References

External links

 UEFA

Armenian Premier League seasons
Arm
1